Ethnikos Piraeus F.C. is a Greek football club based in Piraeus and its parent sports club is Ethnikos OFPF. The club was officially formed in 1923 as Keravnos, but existed since 1922. One year later the club was renamed to Young Boys Titan, after some players' secession that formed Peiraikos Podosfairikos Omilos. The club was renamed to Ethnikos on 23 December 1924, after it merged with Peiraikos Podosfairikos Omilos.

Ethnikos Piraeus was one of the founding members of Hellenic Football Federation in 1926, and represented Piraeus to the finals of the Panhellenic Championship's inaugural season in 1927–28. They have won the 1932-33 Greek Cup, thus they are one of the only 11 clubs that have won either the championship or the cup in Greece. Ethnikos was one of seven clubs, including AEK Athens, PAOK, Panathinaikos, Aris Thessaloniki, Olympiacos and Panionios, never to have been relegated from the league until 1990. They have also been involved in international football playing a number of friendlies against famous clubs such as Inter Milan, Galatasaray S.K., and Hungary national football team in the 1950s, and participated in the Balkans Cup on two occasions. They have had a turbulent recent history, and are currently competing in the third division Gamma Ethniki.

Background
Known as the club of the upper classes of Piraeus (whereas Olympiacos has always been the team of the lower classes), Ethnikos was established in 1923 from a merger of local sides - Peiraikos Omilos FC and elements of Omilos Filathlon Piraeus - as Omilos Filathlon Piraeus - Faliro (Greek: Όμιλος Φιλάθλων Πειραιώς - Φαλήρου) -meaning Fans' Club of Piraeus and Faliro- after the Piraeus-based football club Athletic and Football Club of Piraeus, winner of the 1924 Athens-Piraeus Regional Championship, split into two.

From the break-up, one group, led by Giorgos Chatziandreou, brothers Kostas and Dimitris Ferlemis, and Christos Peppas, ultimately formed Omilos Filathlon Piraeus – Faliro, meaning Fans' Club of Piraeus and Faliro in 1924, and then changed the name to Ethnikos O.F.P.F. in 1925 the other group, led by Yiannis Andrianopoulos and his five brothers, formed the club that evolved into Olympiacos CFP in 1925. During a meeting in late 1924, members of Peiraikos Omilos and Omilos Filathlon Piraeus Faliro were discussing the final name of the new merge. Christos Peppas dropped the idea of naming the club Olympiacos but it was turned down by the rest of the members. Notis Kamperos, one of the founding members of Olympiacos was present at the meeting and later used the name Olympiacos for the other new emerging team in Piraeus, Olympiacos CFP.

Ethnikos O.F.P.F., colloquially referred to as Ethnikos Piraeus, is a multi-sport club with teams competing in football, water polo, volleyball and basketball.

The club's most significant teams, in terms of history and success, are their football and water polo teams, though football is the more popular sport.

History

Panhellenic Championship years

Prior to 1959–60 Greek football was played in regional championships (Athens, Piraeus, and Thessaloniki championships and/or North and South championships) and then the top teams from each region would advance to play for the national championship.  In some pre-War years a traditional Final match was played between 2 regional champions, but generally the Panhellenic Championship was played as a final round-robin between at least 3 teams.

1920s–1930s
Ethnikos was Piraeus Champion in 1927–28, but lost the national championship to Aris.  The following year Ethnikos was Piraeus Champion once again, but the national championship was not played.

In 1932–33 Ethnikos won the Greek Cup, the club’s only major title. Ethnikos eliminated Apollon in the Quarterfinals and Olympiacos in the Semifinals before meeting Aris in the Final.  Ethnikos and Aris played to a 2–2 draw in Thessaloniki, but Ethnikos won the replay 2–1 and took the Cup.

In 1934–35 Ethnikos was again Piraeus Champion, and then champion of the South Division, while Aris was champion of the North Division, but Ethnikos and Aris were prevented from playing each other for the national championship.

Ethnikos won another Piraeus Championship in 1938–39, but lost the South Division by 2 points, just missing out on a chance to play for the national championship.

Ethnikos reached the Semifinals of the Greek Cup in 1938–39 and 1939–40, but lost to PAOK and Panathinaikos, respectively.

1950s: the Puskás affair

The Ethnikos teams of the mid- to late 1950s are considered by many to be Ethnikos' greatest teams.

In 1955–56 Ethnikos finished 2nd in Greece, just 1 point behind champions Olympiacos.

In 1956–57 a scandal robbed Ethnikos of the national championship. With 4 matches left in the national championship, Ethnikos was favorite for the title, and next on the schedule was Olympiacos, who Ethnikos had already defeated earlier in the season. Prior to the Olympiacos match though, Ethnikos was disqualified from the championship, on the accusation of professionalism, as they had allegedly been in contact with Hungarian stars Ferenc Puskás, Zoltan Czibor and Sándor Kocsis. According to the press the club had agreed with the three Hungarian internationals. Ethnikos was docked 4 points and not allowed to play the final 4 matches of the season, and Olympiacos took the championship.

Alpha Ethniki years

From 1959–60 the Greek championship changed to its modern form and the first division became known as Alpha Ethniki (usually noted as A' Ethniki).  Since 1959–60 Ethnikos is tied for the 8th-most first division participations with 36, along with OFI and Apollon.  Ahead of Ethnikos are traditional powers Olympiacos, Panathinaikos, AEK and PAOK (all of whom have competed in the first division every season except AEK for two seasons recently) as well as Iraklis, Aris and Panionios.  (In 2006–07 the first division was renamed from A' Ethniki to Super League).

1960s
During the 1960s Ethnikos’ best league finishes were 5th in 1962–63 and 6th in 1960–61 and 1967–68.  From 1960–61 to 1968–69 Ethnikos never finished outside the top 10.

Ethnikos reached the Semifinals of the Greek Cup twice during the 1960s.  In 1967–68 Ethnikos lost in the Semifinals to Panathinaikos.  The following year Ethnikos came desperately close to another Cup Final – after defeating PAOK 5–4 in the Quarterfinals, Ethnikos lost to Olympiacos 4–3 after extra time in the Semifinals.

1970s
In 1974–75 Ethnikos made its best challenge for the league championship in the modern era.  That season Ethnikos was winter champion, going undefeated through the first half of the season, but they could not keep up the pace and ultimately finished 4th (1 point behind PAOK for 3rd place and a UEFA Cup berth), while Olympiacos took the championship.

Though never making another legitimate challenge for the league championship, Ethnikos remained consistently competitive during the 1970s, never finishing outside of the top 10.

Ethnikos twice had the league’s top scorer during the 1970s: in the 1974–75 Roberto Calcadera’s total of 20 goals was tied for league-best with Panathinaikos’ Antonis Antoniadis and in 1976–77 Thanasis Intzoglou led the league with 22 goals.

Ethnikos’ two best runs in the Greek Cup in the 1970s were halted by PAOK.  In 1972–72 Ethnikos lost to PAOK 3–2 in the Semifinals and in 1976–77 Ethnikos was defeated by PAOK in the Quarterfinals.

1980s
Ethnikos made decent 7th-place finishes in 1979–80 and 1980–81, but the team would mostly struggle through the rest of the 1980s.

In 1983–84 and 1985–86 Ethnikos reached the Quarterfinals of the Greek Cup but was then eliminated by Panathinaikos and Olympiacos, respectively.

In 1986–87 Ethnikos made a very mediocre 10th-place finish, but late in the season earned one of their more memorable results – winning 6–3 away to Panathinaikos.

The 1987–88 team was the last truly competitive Ethnikos team to date.  That year Ethnikos tried to make a run at a UEFA Cup berth, but ultimately fell short and finished 7th.  The 7th-place finish though was good enough to take some satisfaction from finishing ahead of Olympiacos, who finished 8th.

In the 1988–89 season Ethnikos made a good run in the Cup, reaching the Semifinals before being eliminated by Panathinaikos, but in the league the team finished in the bottom 3 and was relegated to Beta Ethniki for the first time in their history.

Relegation from Alpha Ethniki

1990s
After being relegated from Alpha Ethniki for the first time in 1989, Ethnikos bounced between A' and B' Ethniki throughout the 1990s.  Since a last place finish in 1998–99 though, Ethnikos has not managed to return to A' Ethniki.

The Ethnikos teams of the 1990s included several young players who would leave the club and become star players elsewhere, such as Michalis Kapsis, Yannis Anastasiou and Andreas Niniadis.

2000s

After the 1999–00 season Ethnikos fell from Beta Ethniki to Gamma Ethniki for the first time.  The club’s ultimate low point came when it fell from Gamma Ethniki and spent the 2003–04 season in Delta Ethniki.

In summer 2004 Ethnikos merged with A.O. Mani, the club maintained Ethnikos' logo and colors and continued to be based in Piraeus, but in name became Ethnikos Piraeus – A.O. Mani. Ethnikos fans were very upset with the name change, but that problem was eventually solved, as the club was officially renamed Ethnikos Piraeus in 2007.

In 2005–06 Ethnikos earned promotion back to Beta Ethniki in the final minute of the final match of the season.  With time expiring, a free kick goal from Eduardo Sander Da Silva against Messiniakos made the final score 1–1 and gave Ethnikos the point needed for promotion.

Their first season 2006–07 back in the second tier was successful and in the 2009–10 season they reached the promotion play-offs, but failed to win promotion. It was the first time since the 1999 relegation that the team claimed their return to the Greek football's top flight.

2010s
Next season after having been found guilty of forgery during the winter transfer window, the club was forcibly relegated to the Delta Ethniki for the 2011/12 season. Ethnikos were placed in the Group 9 and relegated to the local amateur leagues at the 5th level of the Greek football pyramid, the lowest in their history.

In the 2012/13 season they were crowned Piraeus champions for first time since 1939 and also reached the Piraeus Cup final, but failed to win promotion to the Football League 2 via the play-offs. Ethnikos won the double in the 2013/14 season (Piraeus champions and Cup winners), and finally managed to return to the third tier of Greek football through the promotion play-offs where they topped the Group 9. The 2014–15 Gamma Ethniki saw them 4th in the Group 4 and runners-up of the Football League 2 Cup. Last season they finished runners-up in the Group 6 of the 2021-22 Gamma Ethniki.

Balkans Cup

1976 competition
After Ethnikos finishing 4th in the 1974–75 Greek League and losing out on a UEFA Cup spot, qualified for the Balkans Cup for the first time in its history. Ethnikos did not manage to win any game, as the star player of the team Washington Calcattera had been injured. They finished bottom of the Group B. The results:

 March 17, 1976, Karaiskaki Stadium: Ethnikos - GNK Dinamo Zagreb 1-0
April 14, 1976, Dinamo Stadium:FK Dinamo Tirana - Ethnikos 2-0
April 26, 1976, Karaiskaki Stadium: Ethnikos - FK Dinamo Tirana 3-4
April 28, 1976, Karaiskaki Stadium: GNK Dinamo Zagreb - Ethnikos 2-1

1992 competition
The Balkans Cup had been limited to just 6 teams. Ethnikos participated as newly promoted team (according to the competition new rule) and qualified automatically to the semifinals, but did not manage to secure a place in the final, though they came close to achieve it in the second leg. The results:

 November 7, 1991, Yusuf Ziya Öniş Stadium: Sarıyer S.K. - Ethnikos 5-0
 November 20, 1991, Karaiskaki Stadium: Ethnikos - Sarıyer S.K. 3-0

Stadiums

Karaiskakis Stadium (1923–2002)

Karaiskakis Stadium in the Faliro area of Piraeus, commonly referred to as Karaiskaki, is the traditional home of both Olympiacos and Ethnikos, but only Olympiacos has played there since the stadium was leveled and rebuilt purely at Olympiacos' expenses ahead of the 2004 Summer Olympics.

In 2002 Olympiacos President Socratis Kokkalis, in announcing the project to rebuild Karaiskakis, said, "It is our wish that [the new stadium] will also be used by Ethnikos F.C., as Karaiskaki is the historic home of both [Olympiacos and Ethnikos]".

Despite that statement, all of the new stadium's seats were painted Olympiacos' red, rather than a neutral color.

When the new Karaiskakis was completed in 2004, Ethnikos was struggling in Gamma Ethniki, and did not move into the stadium; the team instead continued to play most of its home matches in Nikaia Municipal Gymnasium (2002–2005), a small stadium in the Nikaia area of Piraeus, which is the traditional home of Proodeftiki F.C.

In 2005–06 Ethnikos moved to Georgios Kamaras Stadium in Rizoupoli (where Olympiacos played its home matches during the Karaiskakis renovations), and played there one more season until the move to Elliniko in 2007.

Despite a clause in the contract of Olympiacos's long-term lease of the stadium, which states that Ethnikos may return to Karaiskaki whenever they wanted, without sharing any significant stadium-related costs, the team has opted not to return to Karaiskaki in the near future. The Chairman of Ethnikos has stated that when the team returns to the top division, the issue of returning to Karaiskaki will be revisited.

Karaiskakis Stadium is owned by the Hellenic Olympic Committee.

Elliniko (2007–2014)

In August 2007 Ethnikos President Nikos Pirounias finalized a deal with the City of Ellinikon for use of the complex for 3 years with an option for a further 3 years.  The Olympic Baseball Centre's main stadium underwent renovations for football use, and Ethnikos began playing matches there during the 2007–08 season; the team played its first official match in its new home on October 20, 2007.  The facility became known as Elliniko Stadium, and is commonly referred to as Elliniko.

Helliniko Olympic Complex in Ellinikon, was located approximately 8 kilometres south of the center of Athens, near Glyfada on the Mediterranean coast.

The complex was built on the site of the former Ellinikon International Airport for the staging of the 2004 Summer Olympics and 2004 Summer Paralympics, and consisted of the following venues: Helliniko Indoor Arena (Basketball and Team handball); Helliniko Fencing Hall; Olympic Hockey Stadium (Field hockey); Helliniko Baseball Centre; Helliniko Softball Centre; and Helliniko Slalom Centre (Whitewater slalom).

The complex also included new training pitches for both Ethnikos' first team and youth team.

Ahead of the 2008–09 season renovations continued and seating capacity was increased to 9,000. In 2013 AEK FC started talks with the Olympic Committee for using the stadium and increasing the capacity to 22.000, but there was no official offer. Ethnikos continued playing at Elliniko for one more season and then moved to Moschato ground with wooden stands and capacity of 2,500 (2014–2017). The Elliniko stadium is currently out of use, abandoned and has been used as a refugees camp point instead, having suffered severe damages which led to its closure.During the 2017-2021 period Ethnikos moved to the Grigoris Lambrakis Stadium and the club currently uses the Agioi Anargyroi ground.

Crest and colours

Ethnikos' crest has changed through times. The original club logo was a white cross in a blue coloured badge with the monotype E in the middle of the cross depicting the Greek flag. Later it was replaced by one with blue and white stripes having the club's name on the top of the badge. After the 2011 takeover of the club by Alexis Aggelopoulos, the logo was changed once again to a more "modern" looking one.  
Throughout the entire club's history its colours were blue or cyan and white, to resemble the colours of the Greek flag.

Kit evolution

Rivalries

Piraeus derby (football) 

Since the two clubs were established in the mid-1920s, Ethnikos' traditional local rival has been Olympiacos, one of the two most popular and successful multi-sport clubs in Greece along with Panathinaikos.

Ethnikos was founded on November 21, 1923 while Olympiacos was founded on March 10, 1925.

Olympiacos has never been relegated in football while Ethnikos has 4 relegations from the first division (1990, 1992, 1996, 1999)

In water polo Olympiacos has never been relegated while Ethnikos has been relegated twice (2009, 2012).

While a legitimate rivalry between Ethnikos and Olympiacos still exists in water polo (Ethnikos Piraeus Water Polo Club has won the most Greek water polo championships of any club, while Olympiacos Water Polo Club has won the second-most), that is no longer the case in football.

Ethnikos and Olympiacos were more or less evenly matched and had great battles for Piraeus supremacy in the 1920s and 1930s, but thereafter Olympiacos became increasingly more powerful and successful; Ethnikos has not defeated Olympiacos in a league match since the 1985–86 season and has not finished above Olympiacos in the league standings since the 1987–88 season.

Olympiacos's biggest win is 5-0 twice (1966, 1968) while Ethnikos's is 4-2 twice (1929, 1939)

Since 1960 and the introduction of A' Ethniki, Olympiakos won 53 times, Ethnikos 4 times and 15 matches ended as a draw.

Last win for Ethnikos is in 1986 in Olympic Stadium (2-0) while Olympiacos's is the last match they played each other in 1999 (0-3 for Olympiacos).

A recent point of contention for Ethnikos fans has to do with Karaiskakis Stadium. Karaiskakis is the traditional home of both Olympiacos and Ethnikos, but only Olympiacos has played there since the stadium was rebuilt for use in the 2004 Summer Olympics.

Players

Current squad

Personnel

Honours

Domestic
Panhellenic Championship
Runners-up (2): 1928, 1956
 Greek Cup
 Winners (1): 1933
 Semi-finalists (7): 1939, 1940, 1950, 1968, 1969, 1973, 1989
 Piraeus Championship (Regional Championship, pre-Alpha Ethniki/Super League format)
 Winners (3): 1928, 1929, 1939
 Runners-up (12): 1925, 1934, 1937, 1938, 1946, 1949, 1950, 1951, 1952, 1953, 1956, 1959
 Football League (Greece)
 Winners (1): 1991
 Gamma Ethniki Cup
 Runners-up (1) : (2015)
  EPS Piraeus Championship (Regional Championship, after-Alpha Ethniki/Super League format)
 Winners (2): 2013, 2014
  EPS Piraeus Cup (Regional Championship, after-Alpha Ethniki/Super League format)
 Winners (1): 2014
 Runners-up (1) : 2013
 Greek Easter Cup
 Winners (1) : 1937

Season-by-season
Panhellenic Championship years (until 1959)

(Note: National Championship not played in 1928–29 and 1934–35, seasons when Ethnikos won either the regional championship, or the South Greece championship)

Alpha Ethniki/Super League years (since 1959–60)

Since 1927–28:

 49 seasons in First tier of Greek football (9th–most in Greece) (1928, 1931–1936, 1939–1940, 1956–1959, 1960–1990, 1992, 1995–1996, 1998–1999)
10 seasons in Second tier of Greek football (1991, 1993–1994, 1997, 2000, 2007–2011)
 12 seasons in Third tier of Greek football (2001–2003, 2005–2006, 2015–2019, 2022–2023)
 4 seasons in Fourth tier of Greek football (2004, 2012, 2020–2021)
 2 seasons in Local tier of Piraeus football (2013, 2014)

Records and statistics

Most appearances (A' Ethniki)

Most appearances by a foreign player (A' Ethniki)

Most goals (A' Ethniki)

Most goals by a foreign player (A' Ethniki)

Top scorers by season

Coaches by season

Notable players

Notable coaches

  Nikos Alefantos
  Lysandros Georgamlis
  Lakis Petropoulos
  Ioannis Kyrastas
  Antonis Georgiadis
  Savvas Pantelidis
  Giannis Pathiakakis 
  Spyros Livathinos
  Richie Barker
  Todor Veselinović
  Pietr Packert
  Manol Manolov
  Kazimierz Górski
  Nenad Starovlah
  Panos Markovic
  Walter Skocik
  Howard Kendall

Chairmen
 Dimitris Karellas: 1953–1988
 Misidis: 1988–Jan.1989
 Makis Zouboulidis: Jan.1989–1994
 Nikos Pateras / Alekos Giannakopoulos: 1994–1997
 Vasilis Tsiamakis: 1997-99
 Makis Psomiadis: 1999
 Belitsios:  Jan.2000–02
 Delimanis: 2002–2003
 Nikos Pirounias: 2004–2011
 Alexis Aggelopoulos: 2011–2017
 Spyros Kotsopoulos: 2017–2019
 Dimitris Koulouris: 2021–2022

References

External links
 Ethnikos Piraeus – official site
 Ethnikos Piraeus – official site
 Gate 14  – supporters' club site and forum
 Ultras 14 – supporters' club site
 Ethnikos.gr – independent news site

 
Association football clubs established in 1923
Football clubs in Piraeus
1923 establishments in Greece
Gamma Ethniki clubs
Football